Saffo is an opera in three acts by Giovanni Pacini set to a libretto by Salvadore Cammarano, which was based on a play by Franz Grillparzer, after the legend of the ancient Greek poet Sappho.

Performance history 
The opera was first performed at the Teatro San Carlo in Naples on 29 November 1840, and was also given in Paris at the Théâtre-Italien on 15 March 1842. It was frequently performed during the 19th century. Its first UK presentation was on 1 April 1843 at the Theatre Royal, Drury Lane in London and, in the US in 1847 in New York.

It saw occasional revivals during the 20th century. Notable ones took place at the San Carlo on 7 April 1967, with Leyla Gencer, and at the Wexford Festival in 1995 under Maurizio Benini with Carlo Ventre as Faone.

Roles

Synopsis
Place: Greece
Time: Antiquity

During the Poetic Games at the 42nd Olympiad (about 608 BC) a woman poet named Saffo sings so effectively against the practice of tossing felons and undesirables from a cliff on the Island of Leucadia in the hope that Apollo will catch them before they drown in the sea (the Leucadian Leap) that the god's high priest, Alcandro, is driven away in contempt. He vows to get revenge. The priest come upon Faone, a suitor of Saffo given to jealousy. At Alcandro's prompting, Faone denounces Saffo for preferring the poet Alceo to himself.

Later, with Saffo and Apollo being in conflict, she cultivates a friendship with Climene, the daughter of Alcandro, in order to seek the priest's intercession with the god. Saffo agrees to sing at Climene's wedding, but when she finds that the husband-to-be is Faone, the poet completely loses self-control, tries to break up the wedding, vandalizes Apollo's altar and is driven away.

Saffo turns up on the clifftop at Leucadia, convinced that her continuing love for Faone is a curse from Apollo. She intends to throw herself off the cliff in the hope that the god will catch her and remove the painful love. As required by custom, she identifies herself to Ippias, the curator of the Leap. He gives her the go-ahead to jump but an old man idling nearby has heard everything. He recognizes Saffo as Alcandro's long-lost daughter and therefore Climene's sister. Alcandro, Climene and Faone arrive. There is a happy reunion until Ippias points out that Saffo has made an agreement with Apollo from which she cannot back out. Saffo accepts her fate, bids farewell to everybody, and jumps. Climene faints. Faone has to be restrained from jumping, too. Apollo, still angry with her, allows Saffo to drown.

Recordings

References
Notes

Sources
Period librettos:
Florence: Galletti, 1842 edition free access
Milan-Naples: Ricordi, 1865 edition free access 
Balthazar, Scott L. (1997), "Saffo", in Sadie, Stanley (ed.), The New Grove Dictionary of Opera, New York: Grove (Oxford University Press), Vol. 4, p. 123. 
Mancini & Rouveroux (1986), Le guide de l'opéra, Fayard. 
  Pessina, Marino (2007), Saffo, in Gelli, Piero & Poletti, Filippo (editors), Dizionario dell'opera 2008, Milan: Baldini Castoldi Dalai, pp. 1168-1169,  (reproduced at Opera Manager)
Rose, Michael (2001), "Giovanni Pacini" in Holden, Amanda, (Ed.) The New Penguin Opera Guide, New York: Penguin Putnam, Inc.

External links

Cultural depictions of Sappho
Italian-language operas
Operas by Giovanni Pacini
Operas
Opera world premieres at the Teatro San Carlo
Adaptations of works by Franz Grillparzer